Romice Haralambie is a Romanian sprint canoer who competed in the early 1990s. He won a gold medal in the C-2 10000 m event at the 1991 ICF Canoe Sprint World Championships in Paris.

References

Living people
Romanian male canoeists
Year of birth missing (living people)
ICF Canoe Sprint World Championships medalists in Canadian